Boğazköy can refer to the following places:

In Turkey
 Boğazkale, a town and district in Çorum Province
 Hattusa, the ancient Hittite site located near Boğazkale
 Boğazköy, Amasya
 Boğazköy, Bucak
 Boğazköy, Dicle
 Boğazköy, Ergani
 Boğazköy, Gercüş
 Boğazköy, İnegöl
 Boğazköy, Karacabey
 Boğazköy, Mustafakemalpaşa
 Boğazköy, Sarıyahşi

Elsewhere
 Boğazköy, Cyprus, in Kyrenia District
 Boğazköy, the Turkish name for Cernavodă, Romania